Vlada Ralko (born in 1969) is a Ukrainian painter. Based in Kyiv, she has been a member of the National Union of Artists of Ukraine since 1994 and was a laureate of the UN Women's Women in Arts award in 2019.

Biography
Vlada Ralko was born in Kyiv, Ukraine in 1969. In 1987, she graduated from the Taras Shevchenko Republican Art School, and in 1994 she received a degree from the National Academy of Visual Arts and Architecture.

Ralko works in traditional art genres, art and drawing. Ralko's art has been displayed in exhibitions across Ukraine, as well as at the SCOPE Art Show in Miami Beach, the Lincoln Center in New York City, the Dallas Art Fair, and galleries in Germany and Austria.

Publications
Works on Paper, Kyiv, 2007
Kyiv Diary, Lviv, 2019

References

Living people
1969 births
Artists from Kyiv
Shevchenko State Art School alumni
National Academy of Visual Arts and Architecture alumni
21st-century Ukrainian painters